In China, Industrial Party (also translated as Industrialist or Technologist) refers to a group of Chinese thinkers and Chinese people who support scientific thinking, advanced technology, techno-nationalism, and economic growth, but reject liberalism, universal values, and free market. In a narrow sense, it could also refer to the fan culture of Illumine Lingao, a Chinese time-travel novel.

History 
In the 1990s, a great debate erupted in Chinese intellectual circles between the New Left, liberal, and neoconservative schools in the face of China's problems of reality. As the debate spread to the Internet and as a reaction to the liberalism tendency, Chinese cybernationalists with science and engineering academic backgrounds gathered around online forums. A debate progressed in late 2004 and early 2005 by Chinese thinkers Chen Jing and Zhong Qing and marked a precursor to the term.

Regarded as a "tabletop role-playing game novel" covering repeated descriptions and analysis of the possibilities of industrial development, Illumine Lingao further paved the path for the rise of the Industrial Party.

In 2011, a number of Chinese nationalistic thinkers, including Wang Xiaodong and Song Xiaojun, argued only an improvement in means of production and industrial technology could transcend differences between political parties and ideologies. In Wang's blog, "China's Industrialization Will Determine the Fate of China and the World: The 'Industrial Party' versus the 'Sentimental Party'" (later published on a magazine), he analyzed that: 

Wang's essay is often considered to have formally introduced the term "Industrial Party", although Wang himself said that "this expression was invented by a female reporter of a mainstream newspaper". One year later, "Ma Qianzu" (a pen name) and four other people born in the 80s co-authored and published The Big Goal: Our Political Negotiation with this World, which is regarded as the manifesto of the Industrial Party. The same year, Ma and some other industrialists joined guancha.cn, and tried to use the website as a platform for the spread of the idea.

The Industrial Party tendency continued to rise in the 2010s. Both Liu Di's commentary on Radio Free Asia and the Initium Media have linked Liu Cixin, a famous Chinese author, and his novels to the Industrial Party.

Platform
Members of the Industrial Party generally agree:
 Technology determines social structure.
 Technology first.
 Socialist planned economy
 Technocracy.
 Chinese Nationalism.
 Pragmatism.

A reaction to liberalism, Industrialists don't focus on political participation and democracy. Instead, they focus more on effectiveness and academic knowledge. Thus they oppose:
 Agrarianism. They regard it as musty.
 Capitalism, especially free market.
 Universal values. They regard it as a "Western cultural infiltration".

See also
 All Watched Over by Machines of Loving Grace
 Industrial Party Affair
 Saint-Simonianism
 Technocracy movement

References

Citations

Sources
 
 
 
 
 
 
 
 
 
 
 
Alternate history fandom
Chinese Internet slang
Chinese nationalism
History of science and technology in China
Socialism in China
Politics and technology
Political Internet memes